Spathidexia setipennis is a species of fly in the genus Spathidexia of the family Tachinidae.

Distribution
Trinidad and Tobago, Guatemala.

References

Dexiinae
Diptera of North America
Taxa named by Charles Henry Tyler Townsend
Insects described in 1919